Ondřej Lingr (born 7 October 1998) is a Czech football player, who plays as an attacking midfielder for Slavia Prague.

Club career
He made his Czech First League debut for Karviná on 12 May 2017 in a game against Sparta Prague.

On 6 August 2020, he joined Slavia Prague for an estimated amount of €450,000, signing a contract until the summer of 2024.

Career statistics

Club

References

External links
 

1998 births
Living people
Czech footballers
Czech Republic youth international footballers
MFK Karviná players
Czech First League players
Association football forwards
SK Slavia Prague players